Reign of the Red Dragon is video game written by Dave Daring for the TRS-80 and published by Adventure International in 1982.

Gameplay
Reign of the Red Dragon is a dungeon-type adventure in which the player and up to four friends direct a group of five characters on a quest into a castle to recover eight fragments of an ancient scepter, after which the red dragon will appear.

Reception
Bruce Campbell reviewed Reign of the Red Dragon in Space Gamer No. 66. Campbell commented that "If you enjoy this type of program, I recommend Reign of the Red Dragon as superior to some similar programs available in this price range."

In the October 1982 issue of 80-U.S. Journal, David Tinis categorized the game as having similarities to Hellfire Warrior and concluded, "The graphics are well done and even though there is no sound, the game is very enjoyable. I would recommend it highly to anyone who enjoys a good adventure."

References

1982 video games
Adventure International games
Cooperative video games
Role-playing video games
TRS-80 games
TRS-80-only games
Video games developed in the United States